The 1966–67 Scottish League Cup was the twenty-first season of Scotland's second football knockout competition. The competition was won for the second successive season by Celtic, who defeated Rangers in the Final.

First round

Group 1

Group 2

Group 3

Group 4

Group 5

Group 6

Group 7

Group 8

Group 9

Supplementary Round

First Leg

Second Leg

Quarter-finals

First Leg

Second Leg

Semi-finals

Ties

Replays

Final

References

General

Specific

League Cup
1966-67